Mexichromis macropus is a species of sea slug, a dorid nudibranch, a shell-less marine gastropod mollusk in the family Chromodorididae.

Distribution 
This species is recorded from temperate and subtropical Australia including SW Western Australia, South Australia, Tasmania, Victoria, New South Wales and southern Queensland.

Description
Mexichromis macropus has a mantle border decorated with radially arranged orange or yellow-orange stripes rather than spots, as in Mexichromis katalexis or continuous lines as in Mexichromis mariei. The mantle ranges in colour from white to pink-purple and has scattered pointed papillae tipped in purple.

Ecology
This species feeds on a sponge in the genus Dysidea.

References

Chromodorididae
Gastropods described in 1983